Embers in Ashes are an American progressive rock band from Birmingham, Alabama, and they were formed in 2010. Their members are Jeremy Bates, Drew Duvall, Ryan Jackson, Andrew Hargrave, Robert Paul, and Mike Tobey-McKenzie. They released, Outsiders, with Red Cord Records in 2012, and this saw one of the songs, "Then You Came", chart on the Christian Rock charts published by Billboard magazine. The group released, Killers & Thieves, in 2014, with Shamrock Records, and three songs charted on the aforementioned chart from this album, "Into My Arms", "The Mirror", and "What Matters".

Background
The progressive rock band formed in Birmingham, Alabama, in 2010. They count as their members, Jeremy Bates, Drew Duvall, Ryan Jackson, Andrew Hargrave, Robert Paul, 
and Mike Tobey-McKenzie.

Music history
The group formed in 2010, yet their first studio album wasn't released until 2012, Outsiders, by Red Cord Records on August 28, 2012. The song, "Then You Came", charted on the Billboard magazine Christian Rock chart at No. 16. Their second album, Killers & Thieves, was released independently on February on February 25, 2014. They had three songs chart on the aforementioned chart, "Into My Arms" at No. 8, "The Mirror" at No. 6, and "What Matters" currently at No. 5.

Members
Current members
 Jeremy Bates
 Drew Duvall 
 Andrew Hargrave
Past Members
 Robert Paul
 Mike Tobey-McKenzie
 Ryan Jackson
 Rodd Thomas
 Josh Maughon

Discography
Studio albums
 Outsiders (August 28, 2012, Red Cord Records)
 Killers & Thieves (February 25, 2014, Independent)
EPs
 Sorrow Scars EP (September 7, 2010, Independent)
Singles

References

External links
 Official website
 Jesus Freak Hideout article

Musical groups established in 2010
Musical groups from Birmingham, Alabama
Rock music groups from Alabama
American Christian rock groups
2010 establishments in Alabama